Sitiados: México is a Mexican historical drama web television series created by Willy Van Broock, along to Carmen Gloria López. The series is developed by Fox Premium and Estudios Teleméxico. All 8 episodes of the first season became available for streaming on Fox Premium on 26 July 2019. The series is considered an independent production, but in turn is part of the Sitiados series; as a third season set in Mexico. The story revolves around the years 1660 and 1680 between attacks and looting in Veracruz, Mexico. It stars Alfonso Herrera and Eréndira Ibarra.

Plot 
The series revolves around the Mexican municipality of Veracruz of the seventeenth century, specifically, 1683. In a world full of pirates, shamans and caste conflicts, the inhabitants of the city will have to seek survival. The protagonist, León (Alfonso Herrera), witnessed the murder of his father when he was young, having been unfairly hanged. 25 years later, he returns to collect revenge and, according to his plan, arrives at the governor's house presenting himself as Lorenzo.

Cast 
 Alfonso Herrera as Léon / Lorenzo
 Eréndira Ibarra as Inés
 Juan Manuel Bernal as Damián
 Jorge Antonio Guerrero as Tonahuac
 J.C. Montes-Roldán as René
 Enrique Arreola as Chaval
 Everardo Arzate as Guevara
 Gilberto Barraza as Prieto
 Julio Bracho as Agramonte
 Ari Brickman as Van Hoorn
 Carlos Corona as Dupont
 Juan Pablo de Santiago as Chicahua
 Paulette Hernández as Tania
 Ricardo Kleinbaum as Valenciaga
 Claudio Lafarga as Marcial
 Cassandra Sánchez Navarro as Carmina
 Mauricio Isaac as Miguel
 Tomás Rojas as Comandante Español

Guest stars 
 Javier Díaz Dueñas as Gobernador
 Juan Carlos Colombo as Inquisidor

Episodes

References

External links 
 

Mexican television series
2019 Mexican television series debuts
2019 Mexican television seasons
Spanish-language television shows
Television series about organized crime